World Fighting Bull were a Japanese rugby union team that played in the county's Top League competition. The team was the rugby team of clothing company World Co., based in Kobe in the Kansai area of Japan.

The team was founded in 1984, and spent their formative seasons playing in the Kansai League. They were one of the founding members of the Top League, playing in the inaugural season in 2003–04. The team played in the first four editions of the competition, before being relegated at the end of the 2006–07. After two more seasons playing in the Top West League, World Fighting Bull were dissolved in March 2009 after financial difficulties at World Co.

Season history

World Fighting Bull's record since the inception of the Top League in 2003–04 was:

Former players

 Matt Cockbain, flanker or lock
 Keiichiro Masuo,  flanker
 Ifereimi Rawaqa,  flanker or lock
 Masayoshi Tanizaki,  centre or wing
 Mau Touriki, lock
 Shaun Webb,  full-back

External links

 Official site 

Defunct rugby union teams in Japan
Rugby in Kansai
Rugby clubs established in 1984
Sports clubs disestablished in 2009
Sports teams in Kobe
1984 establishments in Japan
2009 disestablishments in Japan
Japanese rugby union teams